Merguinia is a genus of moths belonging to the family Tortricidae. It contains only one species, Merguinia merguinia, which is found in Myanmar.

The wingspan is 9.5 mm. The ground colour of the forewings is yellowish brown, sprinkled with brown and grey and in the dorsoterminal area distinctly suffused grey with black suffusions. The refractive markings are weak and the markings in the costal and terminal areas are brown, while the subterminal fascia and dorsal half of the median fascia are blackish. The hindwings are dark brown.

Etymology
The genus name refers the type locality of the type species and the species name refers to Mergui (now Myeik) in Tenasserim, the type locality.

See also
List of Tortricidae genera

References

External links
tortricidae.com

Tortricini